Elizabeth Davis-Simpson (born December 18, 1965 in the United States), is best known for being an American songwriter, as well as the bassist of the punk rock band 7 Year Bitch. She later worked on projects such as These Streets with Valerie Agnew, and has participated in a band named Clone.

Discography

Albums
Sick 'Em (C/Z Records, 1992).
¡Viva Zapata! (C/Z Records, 1994).
Gato Negro (Atlantic Records, 1996).

Singles/EPs
"Lorna" b/w "No Fucking War," "You Smell Lonely" (Rathouse/Face The Music Records), (1991; reissued by C/Z Records in 1992).
"Antidisestablishmentarianism EP" (Rugger Bugger Records, 1992)
"7 Year Bitch" / "Thatcher on Acid" "Can We Laugh Now?" / "No Fucking War" (Clawfist Records, 1992)
"7 Year Bitch EP" (C/Z Records, 1992)
"Rock-A-Bye Baby" b/w "Wide Open Trap" (C/Z Records, 1994)
"The History of My Future" b/w "24,900 Miles Per Hour" (promo only) (Atlantic Records, 1996)
"24,900 Miles Per Hour" (promo only) (Atlantic Records, 1996)
"Miss Understood" b/w "Go!" (Man's Ruin, 1996)

Other contributions
 "8-Ball Deluxe" on Kill Rock Stars (Kill Rock Stars, Nov '12).
 "Dead Men Don't Rape" on There's A Dyke in the Pit (Outpunk/Harp Records, 1992).
 "The Scratch" on Power Flush: San Francisco, Seattle & You (Rathouse/Broken Rekids, 1993).
 "In Lust You Trust" on Rawk Atlas (promo only) (C/Z Records, 1993).
 "Dead Men Don't Rape" on Progression (Progression, 1994).
 "The Scratch," "Icy Blue" on the Mad Love Motion Picture Soundtrack (Zoo Records, 1995).
 "Kiss My Ass Goodbye" on Seattle Women in Rock: A Diverse Collection (Insight Records, 1995).
 "Damn Good And Well" on Space Mountain (Rough Trade Publishing, 1995).
 "The Scratch" on Take A Lick (promo only) (BMG, 1995).
 "M.I.A." on Notes From The Underground, Vol. 2 (Priority Records, 1995).
 "Mad Dash" on Home Alive: The Art Of Self-Defense (Epic Records, 1996).
 "24,900 Miles Per Hour" on huH Music Sampler No. 23 (promo only, RayGun Press, 1996).
 "Knot (Live)" on Hype! The Motion Picture Soundtrack (Sub Pop Records, 1996).
 "Damn Good And Well" on Rough Cuts: The Best Of Rough Trade Publishing, 1991–1995 (Rough Trade Publishing, 1997).
 "Rock-A-Bye Baby" on She's A Rebel (Beloved/Shanachie Records, 1997).
 "Shake Appeal" on We Will Fall: The Iggy Pop Tribute (Royalty Records, 1997).
 "M.I.A." on Whatever: The 90's Pop & Culture Box (Flying Rhino Records/WEA, 2005).
 "The Scratch" on Sleepless in Seattle: The Birth Of Grunge (LiveWire Recordings, 2006).

Music videos
"In Lust You Trust" (1992)
"Hip Like Junk" (1994)
"24,900 Miles Per Hour" (1996)

Film
The Gits Movie (2005) Mad Love (1995 film)

References

1965 births
Living people
American punk rock bass guitarists
American rock bass guitarists
American women songwriters
Feminist musicians
Women bass guitarists
Grunge musicians
Musicians from Seattle
Riot grrrl musicians
Songwriters from Washington (state)
Guitarists from Washington (state)
7 Year Bitch members
20th-century American bass guitarists
20th-century American women musicians
21st-century American women musicians
Women in punk